The 2014 Men's World Junior Squash Championships is the men's edition of the 2014 World Junior Squash Championships, which serves as the individual world Junior championship for squash players. The event took place in Windhoek in Namibia from 10 to 15 August 2014. Diego Elias won his first World Junior Open title, defeating Omar El Atmas in the final.

Seeds

Draw and results

Finals

Top half

Section 1

Section 2

Bottom half

Section 1

Section 2

See also
2014 Men's World Junior Team Squash Championships
2014 Women's World Junior Squash Championships
British Junior Open Squash
World Junior Squash Championships

References

External links
Men's World Junior Championships 2014 official website

World Junior Squash Championships
Wor
Squash
Squash tournaments in Namibia
International sports competitions hosted by Namibia
Sport in Windhoek
21st century in Windhoek
Men's World Junior Squash Championships